Campo San Bartolomeo is a city square in Venice, Italy.

Piazzas and campos in Venice